The 1955 Argentine Grand Prix was a Formula One motor race held at Buenos Aires on 16 January 1955. It was race 1 of 7 in the 1955 World Championship of Drivers.

The race was won from third on the grid by Juan Manuel Fangio for Mercedes.  Ferrari drivers Nino Farina and Maurice Trintignant finished both second and third in two three-way shared drives with José Froilán González and Umberto Maglioli respectively. The high temperatures of the Argentinian summer proved to be very taxing for both drivers and cars. Fangio and Roberto Mieres were the only two drivers able to complete the race without handing their car to another driver.

According to former Ferrari and Maserati chief mechanic Giulio Borsari, Fangio acclimatized himself by moving to Argentina one month prior to the race and reducing his water consumption to one liter a day to cope with the extreme heat. Fangio also suffered severe burns to his leg which, for the entire duration of the race, was rubbing against the chassis frame which was being heated by the exhaust. It took him 3 months to recover; his next race in Monaco was not until late May. It left a permanent scar on his leg later in life.



Classification

Qualifying

Race 

Notes
 – Includes 1 point for fastest lap

Shared drives 
 Car #12: José Froilán González (60 laps), Nino Farina (20 laps), and Maurice Trintignant (16 laps). They shared the 6 points for second place.
 Car #10: Nino Farina (50 laps), Umberto Maglioli (22 laps), and Maurice Trintignant (22 laps). They shared the 4 points for third place.
 Car #8: Hans Herrmann (30 laps), Karl Kling (30 laps), and Stirling Moss (34 laps). They shared the 3 points for fourth place.
 Car #28: Harry Schell (50 laps), and Jean Behra (38 laps).
 Car #22: Luigi Musso (50 laps), Sergio Mantovani (20 laps), and Harry Schell (13 laps).
 Car #20: Sergio Mantovani (30 laps), Jean Behra (14 laps), and Luigi Musso (10 laps).
 Car #26: Clemar Bucci (30 laps), Harry Schell (14 laps), and Carlos Menditeguy (10 laps).
 Car #36: Eugenio Castellotti (20 laps) and Luigi Villoresi (15 laps).

Championship standings after the race 
Drivers' Championship standings

Note: Only the top five positions are included. Only the best 5 results counted towards the Championship.

References

Argentine Grand Prix
Argentine Grand Prix
Argentine Grand Prix
Argentine Grand Prix